= Malda Gap =

Malda Gap or Malda–Kishanganj fault is a geographical boundary, primarily located within the Malda region of West Bengal, India separating Chota Nagpur Plateau and Northeastern Himalayan mountains.

The gap is also characterized by a distinct difference in cultural traditions, languages, and religious practices, and is further marked by the presence of historical ruins and a rich tradition of silk weaving. The area is known for its fertile lands, including the diara region, and the impact of river erosion on the bank of the Ganges.
